John L. Duncan (c. 1900 – c. 1969) was a rugby union player who represented Australia.

Duncan, a scrum-half, was born in Sydney and claimed 1 international rugby cap for Australia.

References

Australian rugby union players
Australia international rugby union players
Year of birth uncertain
Rugby union players from Sydney
Rugby union scrum-halves